Anton Peters (2 October 1923 – 2 September 1989) was a Belgian actor.

He was born in Ekeren. On 13 June 1944 he was arrested by the German occupiers in Norway. He was imprisoned at Møllergata 19 from 13 to 17 July 1944, and then at Grini concentration camp until 24 December 1944.

After the war, starting in the 1950s, he had an extensive filmography as an actor, and also appeared in tens of television series. He was also a prolific director.

He was a father-in-law of Marleen Maes and grandfather of Wim Peters, both actors. He died in September 1989 in Knokke.

He acted in several Belgian television series and movies such as De vulgaire geschiedenis van Charelke Dop, Tijl Uilenspiegel and De Paradijsvogels. Peters, employed at the Vlaamse Radio- en Televisieomroeporganisatie, directed a documentary about the Dutch singer Mary Porcelijn in which she acted naked, although she used a stand in. It was the first fully naked woman ever shown on Belgian television. There were such many complaints by the viewers, the broadcasting company had no other choice than fire Peters.

Filmography

References

1923 births
1989 deaths
Belgian male actors
Belgian film directors
Grini concentration camp survivors
Belgian expatriates in Norway
20th-century Belgian male actors
Belgian people imprisoned abroad
People from Ekeren